Konobo, or Eastern Krahn, is a Kru language of Liberia.

Krahn is part of the Wee dialect continuum. Whereas Konobo dialect may be considered a distinct language from Western Krahn dialects, both are intelligible with intermediate dialects.

References

 
Languages of Liberia
Wee languages